Raymond Samuel Foster (1936-2005) was a Welsh Anglican priest in the second half of the 20th century and the first decades of the 21st.

Williams was educated at St David's College, Lampeter. He was ordained Deacon in 1960; and Priest in 1961. After a curacy in Rhyl he held incumbencies at Dyserth, Denbigh and Bwlchgwyn. He was Archdeacon of Wrexham from 1987 to 2001.

References

Alumni of the University of Wales, Lampeter
Archdeacons of Wrexham
20th-century Welsh Anglican priests
21st-century Welsh Anglican priests
1936 births
2005 deaths